Chesky may refer to:

People
Brian Chesky (born 1981), American businessman, co-founder of Airbnb
David Chesky (born 1956), American musician and record label owner
Norman Chesky, American music producer and record label owner
Evelyn Chesky (born 1933), American politician
Larry Chesky (1933–2011), Polka band leader and manager of the record label Rex Records

Other
Chesky Records, an American record label company